River Plate is taking part in Uruguayan Primera División and took part in 2022 Copa Sudamericana, reaching group stage.

Transfer Window

Summer 2022

In

Out

Winter 2022

In

Out

Squad

First team squad

Top Scorers 

Last updated on Oct 8, 2022

Disciplinary Record 

Last updated on Oct 11, 2022

Primera División

Apetura 2022

League table

Results by round

Matches 

1: Fifth round was suspended due to complaints of AUDAF on violence situations suffered by referees. .

2: Seventh round was postponed due to March 27 Referendum. .

Intermedio 2022

League table

Results by round

Matches

Clausura 2022

League table

Results by round

Matches 

3: Fourth and sixth rounds were swapped.

Overall

League table

2022 Copa Uruguay

Round of 32 

River Plate advanced to Round of 16

Round of 16 

Defensor Sporting advanced to Quarterfinals

2022 Copa Sudamericana

First stage 

River Plate won 3–0 on aggregate and advanced to the group stage (URU 2).

Group stage

Group B

References

River Plate Montevideo seasons
River Plate